Acalolepta amamiana is a species of beetle in the family Cerambycidae. It was described by Hayashi in 1962.

Subspecies
 Acalolepta amamiana amamiana (Hayashi, 1962)
 Acalolepta amamiana simillima Breuning & Ohbayashi, 1966

References

Acalolepta
Beetles described in 1962